Johann Rudolf Wyss (4 March 178221 March 1830) was a Swiss author, writer, and folklorist who wrote the words to the former Swiss national anthem Rufst Du, mein Vaterland in 1811, and also edited the novel The Swiss Family Robinson, written by his father Johann David Wyss, published in 1812.

Biography
In 1805, Wyss became the professor of philosophy at Bern's academy. He later became the chief librarian of Bern's city library. He died in Bern.

Together with Gottlieb Jakob Kuhn he edited the periodical Alpenrosen.

Works
 Vorlesungen über das höchste Gut ("Lectures on the highest good", 2 vols., Tübingen, 1811)
 Idyllen, Volkssagen, Legend und Erzählungen aus der Schweiz ("Idylls, folk tales, legends, and stories from Switzerland", 3 vols., 1815–22; partly translated into French in Mme. de Montolieu's Châteaux suisses, 1816)
 Reise im Berner Oberland ("Travels in the Bern highlands", 1808; French translation, Voyage dans l'Oberland bernois, 2 vols., Bern, 1817)

Notes

References

External links
 
 
 
 Pictures and texts of Voyage dans l'Oberland bernois by Johann Rudolf Wyss can be found in the database VIATIMAGES.

1782 births
1830 deaths
Writers from Bern
Swiss philosophers
Swiss songwriters
Johann Rudolf